Thomas George Farris (September 16, 1920November 16, 2002) was an American football quarterback who played for the Chicago Bears (1946–1947) in National Football League the Chicago Rockets (1948) in the All-America Football Conference.

After playing college football at the University of Wisconsin, Farris was an 11th round selection (99th overall pick) of the 1942 NFL Draft by the Green Bay Packers. But before training camp, he enlisted in the United States Coast Guard to serve in World War II. He played 33 regular season games over 3 seasons. In 1946, which was his best season, he had 1 passing touchdown, 2 pass interceptions, 1 reception and 16 receiving yards.

External links
Fantasy Football Challenge
Tom Farris. Pro-Football-Reference.com. Retrieved 2019-04-16.

1920 births
2002 deaths
Sportspeople from Casper, Wyoming
Players of American football from Wyoming
American football quarterbacks
Wisconsin Badgers football players
United States Coast Guard enlisted
United States Coast Guard personnel of World War II
Chicago Rockets players
Chicago Bears players